Achilles Gildo Rizzoli (1896–1981), anonymous during his lifetime, has since his death become celebrated as an outsider artist. He is an unusual example of an "outsider" artist who had considerable formal training in drawing.

Born in Point Reyes, California, Rizzoli lived in San Francisco, where he was employed as an architectural draftsman. In the 1930s he showed his work in exhibits held in his home, which he called the Achilles Tectonic Exhibit Portfolio (A.T.E.P.)  
After his death, a group of elaborate drawings came to light, many in the form of maps and architectural renderings that described an imaginary world exposition (much of which was designated "Y.T.T.E.", for "Yield To Total Elation"). The drawings include "portraits" of his mother (whom he lived with until her death in 1937) and neighborhood children "symbolically sketched" in the form of fanciful  neo-baroque buildings.

Rizzoli published one novel, The Colonnade (1931), under the pseudonym Peter Metermaid.

A film was made about his life and work, called Yield to Total Elation: The Life and Art of Achilles Rizzoli.

External links
Web site for the film Yield to Total Elation
The Ames Gallery the Artists profile of A.G. Rizzoli
The New York Times review of 1998 Rizzoli exhibit at Museum of American Folk Art in New York City.
Achilles G. Rizzoli : biography, bibliography, filmography, links at the Biography Project, popsubculture.com.

References

Jo Farb Hernandez; John Beardsley; Roger Cardinal. A. G. Rizzoli: Architect of Magnificent Visions. Harry N. Abrams, Inc., 1997.
Sarah F. Maclaren (2007). "L'architettura magnifica di Achilles G. Rizzoli". Ágalma. Rivista di studi culturali e di estetica, 14, 2007: 42–57. . In Italian.

1896 births
1981 deaths
20th-century American artists
Outsider artists
Artists from San Francisco
People from Point Reyes, California
20th-century American novelists
American male novelists
Writers from San Francisco
20th-century American male writers